Mirza Mohammad Taqi (c. 1579 – 11 October, 1645), better known as Saru Taqi (meaning "Taqi the blond") was an eunuch in Safavid Iran, who served as the Grand Vizier of the Safavid king (shah) Safi (r. 1629–1642) and the latter's son Abbas II (r. 1642–1666) until he was assassinated on 11 October 1645.

Biography

Origins and early life

Saru Taqi was born in ca. 1579 in Tabriz to a poor middle-class Muslim family, which became disgraced after the death of his uncle Khwaja Qasim Ali. Saru Taqi served in the army during his youth in Isfahan, and was later appointed as the financial minister of the governor of Ardabil, Zu'l Fiqar Qaramanlu. Saru Taqi later served in the same office in Ganja and Shirvan, but was some time later appointed as the Grand  of the governor of Karabakh. In 1615, Saru Taqi was castrated by the Safavid shah Abbas I after having been accused by a furrier named Mu'min of having forcibly had sex with him. His property was then taken, but it was later restored after Abbas I found out that the accusation was false.

One year later, Saru Taqi was appointed as the governor of Mazandaran, and one year after that, was appointed as the governor of Gilan. During his governorship of those two provinces, he laid foundation to many buildings and towns, such as Farahabad and Ashraf. In 1629, Abbas I died and was succeeded by his grandson Safi, whom Saru Taqi enjoyed good relations with. During the same year, Saru Taqi, along with other governors, suppressed the rebellion of Gharib Shah, which took place in Gilan and Mazandaran.

In 1631, Saru Taqi was sent to Baghdad to take part in the renovation of the Shia shrines. Two years later, Saru Taqi dishonored the Safavid Grand Vizier Mirza Talib Khan and secretly had him assassinated. The reason behind these actions was due to a personal hatred Saru Taqi had towards the family of Mirza Talib Khan, whose father Hatem Beg Ordubadi had denied to give Saru Taqi's father a post which he had asked for. Furthermore, Saru Taqi also took over the house of Mirza Talib Khan, which was in Isfahan, the capital of the Safavid Empire.

Vizierate under Safi (1633-1642) 
Safi then appointed Saru Taqi as his new Grand Vizier. During the same year, Saru Taqi made a conspiracy against the powerful military officer Imam-Quli Khan, which resulted in the latter's death and his possessions being converted into the crown estate. In 1634, Saru Taqi appointed his brother Mohammad Saleh Beg as the governor of Mazandaran, thus reducing the power of the descendants of the Marashis, who were the elite of the province.

In 1638, Saru Taqi, who aimed to having Ali Mardan Khan, the governor of Qandahar, dismissed, demanded a large sum of money from him. After having been under pressure by Saru Taqi for some time, Ali Mardan Khan defected to the Mughal Empire of India, and then fled into India. On 12 May 1642, Safi died.

Vizierate under Abbas II and death (1642-1645) 
On 15 May 1642, at Kashan, Mohammad Mirza was crowned as the shah of Iran and chose "Abbas II" as his dynastic name. Since he was less than 10 years old when he became shah, the job of governing Iran was placed in the hands of his mother, Anna Khanum, and Saru Taqi, while Abbas concentrated on his education at Qazvin. Saru Taqi and Anna Khanum worked closely together, and under them Iran was in secure hands. The French traveller Jean Chardin said the following thing about them:

In 1643, Saru Taqi accused the powerful military commander (sipah-salar) Rustam Khan of treason, and had him executed. During the same year, the daughter of Saru Taqi's court ally Jani Khan, was given in marriage to his nephew. One year later, Saru Taqi enlarged the Ali Qapu Palace.

On 11 October 1645, Saru Taqi was betrayed and murdered in his own house by Jani Khan, mostly likely with the approval of Abbas II, who was trying to get independence from his mother and the slaves which supported her. When Anna Khanum heard about the murder of Saru Taqi, she became extremely angry, and sent one of her eunuchs to Jani Khan in order to find out the reason behind the murder. Jani Khan then insulted both Anna Khanum and Saru Taqi, which four days later resulted in his death by an assassin sent by Anna Khanum. The successor of Saru Taqi was a Marashi descendant named Khalifeh Soltan, who had already served as Grand Vizier from 1623 to 1631.

Legacy 
Saru Taqi took part in the construction of many buildings, and is one of the most important builders of the Safavid era. One of these buildings was the one of the most important Shia places, the Imam Ali Mosque, which Saru Taqi rebuilt. Furthermore, he also spent his own revenue to construct commercial and religious buildings, a mosque and a bazaar in Isfahan being of the examples.

Notes

References

Sources

Further reading

 
 

Safavid generals
Grand viziers of the Safavid Empire
Politicians from Tabriz
Iranian eunuchs
Safavid governors in Gilan
History of Mazandaran Province
Safavid governors
17th-century Iranian politicians
1570s births
1645 deaths
Assassinated Iranian people
17th-century people of Safavid Iran